Blind Rage is the 14th studio album by German heavy metal band Accept. It was released on 15 August 2014 on Nuclear Blast Records. The album debuted at number one on the German albums chart. This is Accept's last album with guitarist Herman Frank and drummer Stefan Schwarzmann, who both left the band in December 2014.

Background
The album's title and cover artwork were revealed in early April 2014. At the same time, it was announced that the album was due to be released on 18 July 2014. However, this would later be pushed back to 15 August 2014.

The band announced a touring schedule to promote the album. Four US dates were performed in mid-September 2014. Following that, the band will tour Europe in September and October 2014. Several Australian shows are also scheduled for November 2014.

The album's lead single, "Stampede" was released on 11 July 2014. A video, directed by Greg Aronowitz, was also made for the song. It features the band performing at the Devil's Punchbowl in the California desert. On 13 August 2014, a lyric video was released for "Final Journey".

A guitar solo of Final Journey uses the theme of Morning Mood from Edvard Grieg (Peer Gynt, 1876).

Reception

Gregory Heaney of Allmusic commented that the album was like a guard dog on a short leash; "restrained, but still dangerous, as if at any moment things could break bad and spin out of control."

Ray Van Horn, Jr. of Blabbermouth.net gave a favorable review of the album. He cited it as proof that Accept are still "masters of their trade, no matter who holds the mike." Van Horn also opined that a couple songs on the album reference moments from earlier in the band's career, notably Balls to the Wall and Metal Heart.

Mark Gromen of Brave Words and Bloody Knuckles reacted positively to the album. Gromen noted that the album compares more closely to Blood of the Nations than it does to Stalingrad.

George Nisbet of All About The Rock said "Overall, it’s a solid, dynamic and incredibly vital album… the metal heart of Accept beats stronger with each new release"

Blind Rage debuted at number one on the German charts, making it the band's first number one debut in their career. The album also debuted at number one in Finland, and peaked at #35 on the Billboard 200, making it Accept's highest chart position in the United States.

The album won a 2014 Metal Storm Award for Best Heavy Metal/Melodic Album.

Track listing

Personnel
All credits adapted from liner notes
Band
 Mark Tornillo – lead vocals
 Wolf Hoffmann – guitar
 Herman Frank – guitar
 Peter Baltes – bass guitar
 Stefan Schwarzmann – drums

Production
 Produced, engineered, mixed and mastered by Andy Sneap
 Artwork and layout by Dan Goldsworthy

Charts

References

Accept (band) albums
2014 albums
Albums produced by Andy Sneap
Nuclear Blast albums